Religion in Gombe State is mainly Islam and Christianity. The Sharia is valid for areas with a mainly Muslim population. The Roman Catholic dioceses do not have their seat in the state.

A less than cordial relationship exists between Christians and Muslims in Northern Nigeria in Gombe State. Gombe is known to be the starting point of religious crises in Northern Nigeria. To address and mitigate this, the Nigeria Supreme Council for Islamic Affairs (NSCIA) and the Christian Association of Nigeria (CAN) formed a forum called the Nigeria Inter-Religious Council (NIREC) in 1999 for the purpose of tackling the issues.

See also 
Nigerian sectarian violence

References 

Gombe State
Religion in Nigeria